Kode Nagu (also spelt Kode Naagu) is a 1974 Indian Telugu-language romance film directed by K. S. Prakash Rao and produced by M. S. Reddy. It is a remake of the Kannada film Naagarahaavu (1972) which was based on three Kannada novels: Nagarahavu, Ondu Gandu Eradu Hennu and Sarpa Mathsara, all written by T. R. Subba Rao. The film stars Sobhan Babu, Lakshmi, Chandrakala and Jaggayya.

Plot 

A Hindu man and a Christian woman are in love. However, upon realising they cannot be united in matrimony due to caste and class barriers, commit suicide.

Cast 
 Sobhan Babu
 Lakshmi
 Chandrakala
 Jaggayya

Production 
Kode Nagu is a remake of the Kannada film Naagarahaavu (1972), itself based on three Kannada novels: Nagarahavu, Ondu Gandu Eradu Hennu and Sarpa Mathsara, all written by T. R. Subba Rao. It was directed by K. S. Prakash Rao, and produced by M. S. Reddy under Kowmudi Pictures. The dialogues were written by Aatreya. Cinematography was handled by K. S. Prasad, and the editing by K. A. Marthand.

Soundtrack 
The soundtrack was composed by Pendyala Nageswara Rao, while the lyrics were written by Acharya Aatreya and M. S. Reddy (under the name Mallemala).

Release 
Kode Nagu was released on 15 March 1974, and was distributed by Vijaya Pictures.

See also 
 Raja Nagam
 Zehreela Insaan

References

External links 
 

1970s romance films
1970s Telugu-language films
Films based on adaptations
Films based on Indian novels
Films based on multiple works
Films directed by K. S. Prakash Rao
Films scored by Pendyala Nageswara Rao
Indian interfaith romance films
Telugu remakes of Kannada films